VASP can refer to:
Value-added service provider, a service supplier in telecommunications
Vasodilator-stimulated phosphoprotein, a human protein
Vesicoamniotic shunting procedure;  see Shunt (medical)
Viação Aérea São Paulo airline
Vienna Ab-initio Simulation Package, a quantum chemistry simulation package